Chicken Wagon Family is a 1939 American comedy, directed by Herbert I. Leeds and based on the 1925 novel, The Chicken-Wagon Family, by Barry Benefield. It stars Leo Carrillo in the role originally intended for Will Rogers before his death.

Plot
Jean Paul Batiste Fippany (Leo Carrillo) and his family live a vagabond lifestyle with no home but their traveling wagon. Cecile Fippany (Majorie Weaver), Jean Paul's wife, has been secretly saving money to move into a home. When Jean Paul finds the money, his gambling addiction takes over and he loses the entire savings. Youngest daughter Addie (Jane Withers) catches the attention of policeman Matt Hibbard (Kane Richmond) when she leaves her coat in exchange for coffee and doughnuts.  Taking pity on the homeless family, Hibbard shelters them in an abandoned fire station. Addie and her father begin selling bathtubs for a big profit, which earns them enough money to purchase the fire station building.

Cast
Leo Carrillo – Jean Paul Batiste Fippany 
Jane Withers – Addie Fippany
Marjorie Weaver – Cecile Fippany 
Spring Byington – Josephine Fippany 
Hobart Cavanaugh – Henri Fippany 
Kane Richmond – Matt Hibbard
Adrian Morris – Tough Guy

References

External links
 
 
 
 

1939 films
American black-and-white films
American comedy films
20th Century Fox films
1939 comedy films
Films scored by Samuel Kaylin
Films based on American novels
Films directed by Herbert I. Leeds
1930s English-language films
1930s American films